Slaveevo may refer to the following places in Bulgaria:

 Slaveevo, Dobrich Province
 Slaveevo, Haskovo Province